Chris Love (born in Columbia, Maryland) is an American soccer forward who currently serves as an assistant coach at UMass Boston.  He spent five years playing both indoor and outdoor soccer in the National Professional Soccer League and USISL.

Player
Love attended the University of Hartford, playing on the men's soccer team from 1989 to 1992. He graduated in 1993 with a bachelor's degree in communications.   In 1994, he signed with the Baltimore Spirit of the National Professional Soccer League (NPSL).  He move to the Hampton Roads Mariners of the USISL in 1995.  That fall, he moved to the Canton Invaders of the NPSL.  He then played for Charlotte Eagles from 1996 to 1998.  In 1999, Love played for the Maryland Mania of the USL A-League.

Coach
In 2000, Love began his coaching career with Howard Community College.  In 2008, he became an assistant coach with UMass Boston.

References

External links
UMass Boston Women’s Soccer

Living people
American soccer coaches
American soccer players
USL First Division players
USISL players
Hartford Hawks men's soccer players
Virginia Beach Mariners players
Charlotte Eagles players
Maryland Mania players
National Professional Soccer League (1984–2001) players
Baltimore Spirit players
Canton Invaders players
Association football forwards
Year of birth missing (living people)